Jack Sock and Jackson Withrow were the defending champions, but Sock withdrew from the tournament due to injury. Withrow played alongside Nick Kyrgios, but lost in the quarterfinals to Radu Albot and Yoshihito Nishioka.

Bob and Mike Bryan won the title, defeating Ken and Neal Skupski in the final, 7–6(7–5), 6–4. It was the first all-brothers doubles final on the ATP Tour since June 1977, when Vijay Amritraj and Anand Amritraj beat John Lloyd and David Lloyd 6–1, 6–2 at The Queen's Club in London.

Seeds

Draw

Draw

References

External links
 Main draw

Delray Beach Open - Doubles
2019 Doubles
Delray Beach Open - Doubles
Delray Beach Open - Doubles